The University of Minho (Universidade do Minho) is a public university in Portugal, divided into the following campuses:
 Largo do Paço (rectorate), in Braga
 Campus of Gualtar, in Braga
 Convento dos Congregados, in Braga
 Campus of Azurém, in Guimarães

History 
The University of Minho, founded in 1973, is one of the then named "New Universities" that, at that time, deeply changed the landscape of higher education in Portugal.

Located in the region of Minho, known for its significant economic activity and by the youth of its population, the University of Minho is playing the role of development agent in the region.

With over 19,000 students (42% of which are postgraduate students) and with about 1300 professors and 600 employees, UM is one of the largest Portuguese universities.

As of 2013, the University of Minho appears on the ranking of Times Higher Education as one of the 100 best universities of the world under the age of 50, occupying the 76th position. In 2014, it placed 75th overall. The university is widely regarded for the number of citations of its published papers.

In the Times Higher Education World University Rankings of 2015, the university was ranked between 351 and 400 worldwide.

Schools 
School of Architecture (EA)
School of Arts and Human Sciences (ELACH)
School of Psychology (EP)
Institute of Education (IE)
Institute of Social Sciences (ICS)
School of Economics and Management (EEG) 
School of Engineering (EE)
School of Law (ED)
School of Sciences (EC)
School of Medicine (EM)

List of research units
 Institute for Sustainability and Innovation in Structural Engineering

See also 
Higher education in Portugal
List of universities in Portugal
Minho Campus Party

References

External links 

 
Buildings and structures in Braga
Educational institutions established in 1973
1973 establishments in Portugal
Guimarães